James Otieno Ngoche (born 29 January 1988) is a Kenyan cricketer. He is the brother of three other Kenyan international cricketers, Lameck Onyango, Shem Ngoche and Nehemiah Odhiambo.

Biography
Ngoche was one of three brothers, others being Shem and 
Nehemiah, in the Kenyan squad for the World Cup held in Bangladesh, India and Sri Lanka from 19 February to 2 April 2011.

Suspension
He was suspended from the 2015 ICC World Twenty20 Qualifier tournament after bowling with an illegal action.

References

1988 births
Living people
Kenyan cricketers
Kenya One Day International cricketers
Kenya Twenty20 International cricketers
Cricketers at the 2011 Cricket World Cup